The Walter Reed Medal may refer to a Congressional Gold Medal awarded in 1929, or a medal currently awarded by the American Society of Tropical Medicine and Hygiene. There have also been a number of privately issued commemorative medals in honor of Walter Reed. 

The Congressional Gold Medal was awarded by Congress on February 28, 1929 (Public Law 70-858, 45 Stat. 1409) to each of the persons listed below, "in special recognition of the high public service rendered and disabilities contracted in the interest of humanity and science as voluntary subjects for the experimentations during the yellow-fever investigations in Cuba"

 Aristides Agramonte
 James A. Andrus
 John R. Bullard
 James Carroll
 Doctor R. P. Cooke
 A. W. Covington
 William H. Dean
 Thomas M. England
 Levi E. Folk
 Wallace W. Forbes
 Paul Hamann
 James L. Hanberry
 James Hildebrand
 Warren G. Jernegan
 John R. Kissinger
 Jesse W. Lazear
 John J. Moran
 William Olsen
 Walter Reed
 Charles G. Sonntag
 Edward Weatherwalks
 Clyde L. West

On July 2, 1956, Congress passed a law (70 Stat. 484) to include Gustaf E. Lambert on the list.

On September 2, 1958, Congress passed a law (72 Stat. 1702) to include Roger P. Ames on the list.

References

External links
American Society of Tropical Medicine and Hygiene Walter Reed Medal

Civil awards and decorations of the United States